A Puppeteer is a person who controls a puppet.

Puppeteer may also refer to:

 Puppeteer (comics), DC Comics supervillain
 Puppeteer (software), a Node.js library; see 
 "Puppeteer" (song), by Auryn from the 2014 album Circus Avenue
 Puppeteer (video game), a 2013 videogame by SCE Japan Studio
 Pierson's Puppeteers, frequently abbreviated to "Puppeteer", a fictional alien race from Larry Niven's Known Space books

See also 
 Puppet Master (disambiguation)
 The Master Puppeteer, a 1975 novel